The 2010–11 season of Olympique de Marseille (OM) has the club being involved in four competitions: the Ligue 1, the Coupe de France, the League Cup, and the UEFA Champions League. l'OM will be trying to defend their Ligue 1 title after previously placing first in the 2009–10 Ligue 1.

Season summary
To be written at the end of the season

Key dates
28 July 2010: Marseille win the Trophée des Champions in a penalty shootout against Paris Saint Germain;

7 August 2010: Ligue 1 title holders Marseille suffer an opening day loss to the newly promoted Caen;

4 November 2010: Marseille go into the history books by beating Žilina 7–0 at the Štadión pod Dubňomin Slovakia, thus achieving the biggest away win in the Champions League.

Club

Coaching staff

Kit
For the 2010–11 season, Adidas introduced Marseille's new kits, much different to last season, save for the home kit. The colours of Marseille remain white and sky blue. The away kit is sky blue and has shades of black. The third kit is for use in European competitions only; it is a black kit which has a sky blue collar outline. All of Marseille's kits embody sky blue, one of their main colours.

Supplier : Adidas

Sponsor : BetClic

Other information

Squad

First Team
Updated 5 February 2011.

Out on loan

Reserve squad

Transfers

Summer

In

Total spending:  €40 million

Out

Total income:  €13 million

Winter

In

Total spending:  €

Out

Total income:  €

Loan out

Overall transfer activity

Spending
Summer:   €  2 million

Winter:   €

Total:    €2 million

Income
Summer:   €5 million

Winter:   €

Total:   €5 million

Expenditure
Summer:  €7 million

Winter:  €

Total:  €7 million

Pre-season and friendlies
Marseille starts its 2010–2011 season with a five-game preparation program, spread over July and August, before the start of official competitions. The scheduled match on 24 July against Porto was canceled and replaced by an encounter with Valencia, as well as Catania. On 1 August, there was a tribute to Robert Louis-Dreyfus in a game at the Stade Vélodrome against Valencia. It is also proposed to extend this type of game all year. On 3 September, Marseille have planned to face Ajaccio in the challenge Michael Moretti, won by the Ajaccio at the beginning of the 2008–09 season.

Competitions

Trophée des Champions

Ligue 1

League table

Results summary

Results by round

Matches

Coupe de France

Coupe de la Ligue

UEFA Champions League

Group stage

Knockout phase

Round of 16

Statistics

Appearances and goals
Last updated on 30 December.

|}

References

Olympique de Marseille seasons
Marseille
Marseille